The Ryazan constituency (No.156) is a Russian legislative constituency in Ryazan Oblast. Until 2007 the constituency covered Ryazan and its surroundings in northwestern part of Ryazan Oblast. However, in 2016 Ryazan Oblast constituencies were gerrymandered with Ryazan constituency now covering only half of Ryazan and gaining large eastern rural portion of eliminated Shilovo constituency. Most of former territory of the Ryazan constituency was redistricted to nearby Skopin constituency.

Members elected

Election results

1993

|-
! colspan=2 style="background-color:#E9E9E9;text-align:left;vertical-align:top;" |Candidate
! style="background-color:#E9E9E9;text-align:left;vertical-align:top;" |Party
! style="background-color:#E9E9E9;text-align:right;" |Votes
! style="background-color:#E9E9E9;text-align:right;" |%
|-
|style="background-color:#EA3C38"|
|align=left|Konstantin Laikam
|align=left|Civic Union
|
|17.53%
|-
|style="background-color:"|
|align=left|Sergey Komarov
|align=left|Independent
| -
|10.90%
|-
| colspan="5" style="background-color:#E9E9E9;"|
|- style="font-weight:bold"
| colspan="3" style="text-align:left;" | Total
| 
| 100%
|-
| colspan="5" style="background-color:#E9E9E9;"|
|- style="font-weight:bold"
| colspan="4" |Source:
|
|}

1995

|-
! colspan=2 style="background-color:#E9E9E9;text-align:left;vertical-align:top;" |Candidate
! style="background-color:#E9E9E9;text-align:left;vertical-align:top;" |Party
! style="background-color:#E9E9E9;text-align:right;" |Votes
! style="background-color:#E9E9E9;text-align:right;" |%
|-
|style="background-color:"|
|align=left|Leonid Kanayev
|align=left|Communist Party
|
|26.55%
|-
|style="background-color:"|
|align=left|Mikhail Malakhov
|align=left|Independent
|
|10.41%
|-
|style="background-color:"|
|align=left|Yevgeny Stroyev
|align=left|Independent
|
|7.42%
|-
|style="background-color:"|
|align=left|Nina Aleshina
|align=left|Independent
|
|7.32%
|-
|style="background-color:#A8A821"|
|align=left|Konstantin Laikam (incumbent)
|align=left|Stable Russia
|
|5.42%
|-
|style="background-color:"|
|align=left|Sergey Voblenko
|align=left|Our Home – Russia
|
|4.77%
|-
|style="background-color:"|
|align=left|Vyacheslav Kichenin
|align=left|Independent
|
|4.23%
|-
|style="background-color:"|
|align=left|Anatoly Kapustin
|align=left|Liberal Democratic Party
|
|3.99%
|-
|style="background-color:#D50000"|
|align=left|Sergey Kosourov
|align=left|Communists and Working Russia - for the Soviet Union
|
|3.08%
|-
|style="background-color:"|
|align=left|Igor Trushin
|align=left|Yabloko
|
|2.91%
|-
|style="background-color:#2C299A"|
|align=left|Anatoly Grynin
|align=left|Congress of Russian Communities
|
|2.78%
|-
|style="background-color:"|
|align=left|Aleksandr Gavrilov
|align=left|Power to the People
|
|2.74%
|-
|style="background-color:"|
|align=left|Anatoly Alekseyev
|align=left|Independent
|
|1.86%
|-
|style="background-color:#1A1A1A"|
|align=left|Gennady Telnykh
|align=left|Stanislav Govorukhin Bloc
|
|1.57%
|-
|style="background-color:#C28314"|
|align=left|Yevgeny Podkolzin
|align=left|For the Motherland!
|
|1.43%
|-
|style="background-color:#FF4400"|
|align=left|Aleksandr Yudin
|align=left|Party of Workers' Self-Government
|
|1.15%
|-
|style="background-color:"|
|align=left|Aleksandr Nazarkin
|align=left|Independent
|
|1.09%
|-
|style="background-color:#265BAB"|
|align=left|Vladislav Lomizov
|align=left|Russian Lawyers' Association
|
|1.07%
|-
|style="background-color:#324194"|
|align=left|Mikhail Taraskin
|align=left|Union of ZhKKh Workers
|
|0.83%
|-
|style="background-color:"|
|align=left|Vyacheslav Tkachenko
|align=left|Independent
|
|0.78%
|-
|style="background-color:"|
|align=left|Aleksandr Belyakov
|align=left|Independent
|
|1.52%
|-
|style="background-color:"|
|align=left|Aleksandr Abramovich
|align=left|Working Collectives and Greens for SSR
|
|0.41%
|-
|style="background-color:"|
|align=left|Boris Gusev
|align=left|Independent
|
|0.26%
|-
|style="background-color:#5A5A58"|
|align=left|Boris Gereyev
|align=left|Federal Democratic Movement
|
|0.24%
|-
|style="background-color:#000000"|
|colspan=2 |against all
|
|6.11%
|-
| colspan="5" style="background-color:#E9E9E9;"|
|- style="font-weight:bold"
| colspan="3" style="text-align:left;" | Total
| 
| 100%
|-
| colspan="5" style="background-color:#E9E9E9;"|
|- style="font-weight:bold"
| colspan="4" |Source:
|
|}

1999

|-
! colspan=2 style="background-color:#E9E9E9;text-align:left;vertical-align:top;" |Candidate
! style="background-color:#E9E9E9;text-align:left;vertical-align:top;" |Party
! style="background-color:#E9E9E9;text-align:right;" |Votes
! style="background-color:#E9E9E9;text-align:right;" |%
|-
|style="background-color:"|
|align=left|Nadezhda Korneyeva
|align=left|Communist Party
|
|19.27%
|-
|style="background:#1042A5"| 
|align=left|Mikhail Malakhov
|align=left|Union of Right Forces
|
|13.39%
|-
|style="background-color:#3B9EDF"|
|align=left|Nikolay Bulayev
|align=left|Fatherland – All Russia
|
|9.60%
|-
|style="background-color:#7C273A"|
|align=left|Mikhail Lipatov
|align=left|Movement in Support of the Army
|
|7.94%
|-
|style="background-color:"|
|align=left|Leonid Kanayev (incumbent)
|align=left|Independent
|
|5.50%
|-
|style="background-color:"|
|align=left|Vladimir Aksyonov
|align=left|Independent
|
|5.00%
|-
|style="background-color:"|
|align=left|Boris Khramov
|align=left|Yabloko
|
|4.40%
|-
|style="background-color:"|
|align=left|Valery Danilchenko
|align=left|Our Home – Russia
|
|4.28%
|-
|style="background-color:"|
|align=left|Alina Milekhina
|align=left|Independent
|
|3.80%
|-
|style="background-color:"|
|align=left|Nadezhda Kulikova
|align=left|Independent
|
|3.70%
|-
|style="background-color:#E32322"|
|align=left|Stanislav Terekhov
|align=left|Stalin Bloc – For the USSR
|
|2.13%
|-
|style="background-color:"|
|align=left|Sofya Petrova
|align=left|Independent
|
|1.53%
|-
|style="background-color:"|
|align=left|Cheslav Mlynnik
|align=left|Independent
|
|1.13%
|-
|style="background-color:#C62B55"|
|align=left|Stanislav Karpov
|align=left|Peace, Labour, May
|
|1.09%
|-
|style="background-color:"|
|align=left|Sergey Yudin
|align=left|Independent
|
|1.01%
|-
|style="background-color:"|
|align=left|Yury Malistov
|align=left|Independent
|
|0.93%
|-
|style="background-color:#000000"|
|colspan=2 |against all
|
|13.46%
|-
| colspan="5" style="background-color:#E9E9E9;"|
|- style="font-weight:bold"
| colspan="3" style="text-align:left;" | Total
| 
| 100%
|-
| colspan="5" style="background-color:#E9E9E9;"|
|- style="font-weight:bold"
| colspan="4" |Source:
|
|}

2003

|-
! colspan=2 style="background-color:#E9E9E9;text-align:left;vertical-align:top;" |Candidate
! style="background-color:#E9E9E9;text-align:left;vertical-align:top;" |Party
! style="background-color:#E9E9E9;text-align:right;" |Votes
! style="background-color:#E9E9E9;text-align:right;" |%
|-
|style="background-color:"|
|align=left|Nikolay Bulayev
|align=left|United Russia
|
|31.42%
|-
|style="background-color:"|
|align=left|Nadezhda Korneyeva (incumbent)
|align=left|Communist Party
|
|15.94%
|-
|style="background-color:"|
|align=left|Igor Trubitsyn
|align=left|Independent
|
|11.45%
|-
|style="background-color:"|
|align=left|Aleksandr Sherin
|align=left|Liberal Democratic Party
|
|4.72%
|-
|style="background:"| 
|align=left|Sergey Tabolin
|align=left|Yabloko
|
|4.26%
|-
|style="background-color:"|
|align=left|Viktor Milekhin
|align=left|Independent
|
|4.05%
|-
|style="background:#1042A5"| 
|align=left|Boris Dmitriyev
|align=left|Union of Right Forces
|
|2.14%
|-
|style="background-color:"|
|align=left|Aleksey Mikhaylov
|align=left|Independent
|
|1.99%
|-
|style="background-color:"|
|align=left|Vladimir Viktorov
|align=left|Independent
|
|1.82%
|-
|style="background-color:"|
|align=left|Sergey Kprf
|align=left|Independent
|
|1.75%
|-
|style="background-color:#7C73CC"|
|align=left|Igor Potapov
|align=left|Great Russia – Eurasian Union
|
|1.63%
|-
|style="background-color:#164C8C"|
|align=left|Aleksandr Sidorov
|align=left|United Russian Party Rus'
|
|1.27%
|-
|style="background-color:#000000"|
|colspan=2 |against all
|
|15.55%
|-
| colspan="5" style="background-color:#E9E9E9;"|
|- style="font-weight:bold"
| colspan="3" style="text-align:left;" | Total
| 
| 100%
|-
| colspan="5" style="background-color:#E9E9E9;"|
|- style="font-weight:bold"
| colspan="4" |Source:
|
|}

2016

|-
! colspan=2 style="background-color:#E9E9E9;text-align:left;vertical-align:top;" |Candidate
! style="background-color:#E9E9E9;text-align:left;vertical-align:top;" |Party
! style="background-color:#E9E9E9;text-align:right;" |Votes
! style="background-color:#E9E9E9;text-align:right;" |%
|-
|style="background-color: " |
|align=left|Andrey Krasov
|align=left|United Russia
|
|49.09%
|-
|style="background-color:"|
|align=left|Galina Gnuskina
|align=left|Communist Party
|
|14.68%
|-
|style="background-color:"|
|align=left|Yury Kravchenko
|align=left|Liberal Democratic Party
|
|12.66%
|-
|style="background-color:"|
|align=left|Andrey Lyablin
|align=left|A Just Russia
|
|6.29%
|-
|style="background:"| 
|align=left|Denis Desinov
|align=left|Communists of Russia
|
|4.77%
|-
|style="background:"| 
|align=left|Maria Yepifanova
|align=left|Yabloko
|
|3.47%
|-
|style="background-color:"|
|align=left|Vladimir Rogov
|align=left|Rodina
|
|2.68%
|-
|style="background:"| 
|align=left|Irina Kusova
|align=left|People's Freedom Party
|
|2.33%
|-
|style="background-color:"|
|align=left|Andrey Tumashev
|align=left|The Greens
|
|1.18%
|-
| colspan="5" style="background-color:#E9E9E9;"|
|- style="font-weight:bold"
| colspan="3" style="text-align:left;" | Total
| 
| 100%
|-
| colspan="5" style="background-color:#E9E9E9;"|
|- style="font-weight:bold"
| colspan="4" |Source:
|
|}

2021

|-
! colspan=2 style="background-color:#E9E9E9;text-align:left;vertical-align:top;" |Candidate
! style="background-color:#E9E9E9;text-align:left;vertical-align:top;" |Party
! style="background-color:#E9E9E9;text-align:right;" |Votes
! style="background-color:#E9E9E9;text-align:right;" |%
|-
|style="background-color: " |
|align=left|Andrey Krasov (incumbent)
|align=left|United Russia
|
|39.57%
|-
|style="background-color:"|
|align=left|Oleg Strukov
|align=left|Communist Party
|
|13.78%
|-
|style="background-color:"|
|align=left|Aleksandr Averin
|align=left|A Just Russia — For Truth
|
|11.12%
|-
|style="background-color: " |
|align=left|Dmitry Detinov
|align=left|New People
|
|7.62%
|-
|style="background: "| 
|align=left|Andrey Lyubimov
|align=left|Yabloko
|
|7.49%
|-
|style="background-color:"|
|align=left|Maksim Mustafin
|align=left|Liberal Democratic Party
|
|5.57%
|-
|style="background:"| 
|align=left|Sergey Perimbayev
|align=left|Communists of Russia
|
|5.46%
|-
|style="background-color: "|
|align=left|Pavel Voronin
|align=left|Party of Pensioners
|
|5.31%
|-
|style="background-color:"|
|align=left|Aleksandr Rzhanov
|align=left|Rodina
|
|1.23%
|-
| colspan="5" style="background-color:#E9E9E9;"|
|- style="font-weight:bold"
| colspan="3" style="text-align:left;" | Total
| 
| 100%
|-
| colspan="5" style="background-color:#E9E9E9;"|
|- style="font-weight:bold"
| colspan="4" |Source:
|
|}

Notes

References

Russian legislative constituencies
Politics of Ryazan Oblast